A House in the Sky is a 2013 memoir by Amanda Lindhout, co-written with the journalist Sara Corbett. It recounts Lindhout's experience in southern Somalia as a hostage of teenage militants from the Hizbul Islam fundamentalist group. The book was a New York Times bestseller in 2013. It also won the 2014 CBC Bookie Award for Best Canadian Nonfiction and was nominated for the 2014 Libris Award for best non-fiction book of 2013. 

The book was optioned in 2014 by Megan Ellison in order to create a screen adaptation of the work. Rooney Mara will play Lindhout in the film version.

References

2013 non-fiction books
Canadian autobiographies
Books about Somalia
Autobiographies adapted into films
Charles Scribner's Sons books